Olympic Hot Springs is located in Olympic National Park, Washington, United States. The springs contain 21 seeps near Boulder Creek, a tributary of the Elwha River.

History
Olympic Hot Springs were used by the Klallam Tribe for centuries as a place for vision quests.  With the help of a Klallam friend, Andrew Jacobsen in 1892 was the first person of European descent to make it to the hotsprings. They were rediscovered in 1907, after which a trail was blazed to the springs and a resort was built.

A resort existed on the site until 1966 when its lease with the National Parks expired.  Since then the site has not been developed and the buildings that existed have been removed.

Description

The spring is accessed by using the Appleton Pass Trail which is about a  relatively easy hike. In the past, one was able to drive and park at the trailhead. However, due to the removal of the Glines Canyon Dam and subsequent road washout, the road ends at the Madison Falls Trailhead and you must hike an additional 8 miles to the Appleton Pass trailhead. Another hot spring in the area is the developed Sol Duc Hot Springs. The springs lie on a fault and it is likely that the breaks in the rock allow surface water to be heated and driven back from the hot interior of the earth. However geologists say they are uncertain of the mechanism that produce the springs.

The depth of the pools averages around one foot. Some pools are deeper due to rocks being placed to block the exit of the spring water.

A sign at the Olympic Hot Springs trailhead reads:

See also
Boulder Lake (Washington)
Boulder Peak (Washington)

References

External links

 National Park Service Boulder Creek Campground
 outdoor.com, Washington, Olympic Hot Springs Trail

Bodies of water of Clallam County, Washington
Hot springs of Washington (state)
Landforms of Olympic National Park
Protected areas of Clallam County, Washington